Evergreen Cemetery, also known as Pine Plains Cemetery due to its location in that town, is an active cemetery located near the northern border of Dutchess County, New York with Columbia County, New York.

Notable burials
 Philip John Amelio (1977–2005), child soap opera actor

References

External links
 
 Pine Plains Evergreen Cemetery in Pine Plains, New York CountyOffice.org
 
    

Cemeteries in Dutchess County, New York